Final league standings for the 1934-35 St. Louis Soccer League.

League standings

Top Goal Scorers

External links
St. Louis Soccer Leagues (RSSSF)
The Year in American Soccer - 1935

1934-35
1934–35 domestic association football leagues
1934–35 in American soccer
St Louis
St Louis